The BMW 326 is a medium-sized sedan produced by BMW between 1936 and 1941, and again briefly, under Soviet control, after 1945. The 326 was BMW's first four-door sedan. It had an innovative design and sold well despite its relatively high price. It also had an unusually involved afterlife.

Design and engineering
Designed by Fritz Fiedler, the 326 featured a box-section frame that could readily be adapted for derivative models. Also innovative were the torsion bar rear suspension, inspired by the dead axle suspension of the Citroën Traction Avant, and the hydraulic braking system, the first to be used on a BMW car. Styled by Peter Schimanowski, the 326 was offered as a four-door sedan and as a two- or four-door cabriolet. The 326 sedan was the first BMW available with four doors. The BMW 320, BMW 321, BMW 327, and BMW 335 were based on the 326. The streamlined form of the body contrasted with previous relatively upright BMWs: drag was presumably reduced further by including a fixed cover over the spare wheel at the back.

Drivetrain

The four-speed gear box was supported by freewheeling on the bottom ratios and synchromesh on the top two.

Reception
The 326 was introduced at the Berlin Motor Show in February 1936, the 326 was offered for sale from May of that year. The 326 was a success. By the time production was suspended in 1941, the Eisenach plant had produced 15,949 of them.

Afterlives
East Germany

In 1945, Eisenach was occupied by US forces. However, the wartime allies had already agreed that Thuringia would fall within the Soviet occupation zone. The plant that BMW had originally acquired in 1929 was not fully destroyed, and it was possible for returning survivors to assemble sixteen postwar 326s. A modernised version, badged initially as the BMW 340, emerged around 1948. Despite the nomenclature, it was clear that BMW’s Eisenach plant was no longer under the control of BMW: later BMW 340s, still based on the prewar 326, were badged as EMW 340s following a protracted dispute concerning title to the BMW name. It was, perhaps, a tribute to the 326's perceived excellence, together with the skills of the workers who had struggled to revive it, that the Eisenach plant was permitted to produce the BMW design till approximately 1955, long after the Auto Union assembly facilities at nearby Zwickau had been dismantled and removed to Russia as part of the war reparations package.

United Kingdom

The Russians were not alone in being impressed by the 326. Detailed plans of the sedan and coupé derivative models were also rescued by the British. Family connections, involving the founder of the Bristol Aeroplane Company and a Frazer-Nash director who had imported to England and adapted BMW designs in the 1930s, led to Bristol. A succession of Bristols cars introduced between 1947 and 1953 were unapologetic developments of the respected BMW design. The engine size, at 1971 cc, was unchanged.

References

326
Executive cars
Rear-wheel-drive vehicles
1940s cars
Cars introduced in 1936
Compact executive cars
Limousines
Convertibles
Sedans